Breitscheid is a municipality in the Lahn-Dill-Kreis in Hesse, Germany.

Geography

Location
Breitscheid lies from 266 to 600 m above sea level on the eastern slope of the Westerwald range at the point shared by three German states: Hesse, Rhineland-Palatinate and North Rhine-Westphalia.

Erdbach, a constituent community, lies in an interesting place with regards to Earth's history, in the eastern part of the Westerwald, near that range's highest peak, Fuchskauten (657 m).

Geology
In the Erdbach area are noteworthy limestone deposits from various geological time periods. "Erdbach limestone" from Lower Carboniferous times gave an era the name "Erdbachium". The Erdbach – the village's namesake brook – disappears into a karst system, and does not appear again for 1.5 km where it can be seen in a quarry.

Not far from there, the "Homberg" fossil reserve was instituted, which serves some university institutes from Jena to the Rhine as a research area. The older limestone formation near Breitscheid (main centre) stems from a subtropical coral reef from the Devonian period (mid-Palaeozoic, 400,000,000 years ago).

In the "stone chambers" of the Rolsbach valley, some gravesites from Hallstatt times (about 550 BC) were unearthed in 1884. In archaeology, there is a special burial ornament called an "Erdbach coil torc" (Erdbacher Wendelhalsring). It is also believed that Neanderthal people once lived nearby, but this belief awaits further discovery.

Neighbouring communities
Breitscheid borders in the north on the community of Burbach (Siegen-Wittgenstein district in North Rhine-Westphalia), and the towns of Haiger and Dillenburg, in the east on the town of Herborn, in the south on the community of Driedorf (all in the Lahn-Dill-Kreis), and in the west on the communities of Willingen and Liebenscheid (both in the Westerwaldkreis in Rhineland-Palatinate).

Constituent communities
Aside from the main centre, which bears the same name as the whole, there are outlying centres called Erdbach, Gusternhain, Medenbach and Rabenscheid. The community came into being on 1 January 1977 as part of Hesse's municipal reforms. The constituent communities were formerly independent municipalities.

Politics

Municipal council

The municipal elections on 26 March 2006 yielded the following results:

Note: FWG is a citizens' coalition.

Main sights
 Töpfermuseum Breitscheid (Breitscheid Pottery Museum) displays the development of pottery and has pottery products on display from the last 250 years.
 The old Fortress church in Breitscheid.
 Erdbacher Höhlen (caves), karst caves and a karst spring.

References

 Museum "Zeitsprünge" (English: jumps in time) - geology, archaeology, history of cave discovering

External links
official Website of Breitscheid
Private source for cave system and geology
Private source for Earth history and karst nature trail

Lahn-Dill-Kreis